How We Roll may refer to:

 "How We Roll", a song by Hollywood Undead from the album Day of the Dead
 How We Roll (album), an album by the Barrio Boyzz
 "How We Roll" (Big Pun song), 2001
 "How We Roll" (Loick Essien song), 2011
 How We Roll (TV series), a 2022 CBS sitcom inspired by ten-pin bowler Tom Smallwood